Wang Gungwu,  (born 9 October 1930) is a Chinese-Singaporean historian, sinologist, and writer. He is a historian of China and Southeast Asia. He has studied and written about the Chinese diaspora, but he has objected to the use of the word diaspora to describe the migration of Chinese from China because both it mistakenly implies that all overseas Chinese are the same and has been used to perpetuate fears of a "Chinese threat", under the control of the Chinese government. An expert on the Chinese tianxia ("all under heaven") concept, he was the first to suggest its application to the contemporary world as an American Tianxia.

Background
Wang was born in Surabaya, Indonesia to ethnic Chinese parents from Taizhou, Jiangsu and grew up in Ipoh, Malaysia. He completed his secondary education in Anderson School, an English medium school in Ipoh. Wang studied history in the University of Malaya, where he received his bachelor's and master's degrees. He was a founding member of the University Socialist Club and its founding president in 1953.

He holds a PhD from the School of Oriental and African Studies, University of London (1957) for his thesis The structure of power in North China during the Five Dynasties. He taught at the University of Malaya (in both Singapore and Kuala Lumpur). He was one of the founders of the Malaysian political party Gerakan, but he was not personally directly involved in the party's activities.

In 1965, he chaired a Committee to review the curriculum of Nanyang University. The Committee reported in May 1965. Meanwhile, in August 1965, Singapore separated from the Federation of Malaysia as an independent republic. In September 1965, the committee was released and the university accepted the recommendations, triggering students protests, petitions, and boycotts of classes and examinations.

In 1968 he went to Canberra to become Professor of Far Eastern History in the Research School of Pacific and Asian Studies (RSPAS) at the Australian National University. He took a turn as Director of RSPAS, 1975–80. He was Vice-Chancellor of the University of Hong Kong from 1986 to 1995. In 2007, Wang became the third person to be named University Professor by the National University of Singapore.

In 1994, Wang was awarded the Academic Prize of the Fukuoka Asian Culture Prize by the Japanese city of Fukuoka. On 12 June 2009, he was one of ten eminent persons to receive an honorary degree to celebrate Cambridge University's 800th anniversary; he was awarded a Doctor of Letters (honoris causa). In 2020 Wang was awarded the Tang Prize in Sinology. He was also awarded the Distinguished Service Order (Singapore) in August 2020.

He is a naturalized Australian after 18 years of teaching there, yet he does not consider himself Australian because "both his understanding of Australia and the understanding of Australians about him had been superficial".

Recent Awards and Accomplishments
The 2020 Tang Prize in Sinology was awarded to Professor Wang Gungwu by the Tang Prize Foundation. According to the National University of Singapore, Professor Wang, who is "one of the world's foremost experts on the Chinese diaspora", was granted the prestigious award "in recognition of his trailblazing and dissecting insights on the history of the Chinese world order, overseas Chinese, and Chinese migratory experience". The Straits Times reported that the Tang Prize Foundation praised his "unique approach to understanding China by scrutinising its long and complex relation with its southern neighbours". The organisation, which is based in Taiwan, mentioned that his work has "significantly enriched the explanation of the Chinese people's changing place in the world, traditionally developed from an internalist perspective or relation to the West". Professor Chen Kuo-tung of Taiwan's top think-tank Academia Sinica,  highlighting the significance of Professor Wang Gungwu's works that merited the award, said that "Professor Wang's research filled a gap in Sinology, which is the study of Chinese overseas".

In April 2021, Wang Gungwu was granted the Distinguished Service Order in Singapore. Professor Wang, who was also the founding Chairman of the Lee Kuan Yew School of Public Policy at NUS and the former Chairman of the ISEAS-Yusof Ishak Institute and East Asian Institute (EAI), was acknowledged for his important capacity in "developing world-class research institutions in Singapore". The award also recognised his publication of "pioneering works on the history of China, South-east Asia, and East Asia, as well as the Chinese diaspora in South-east Asia and Singapore, providing invaluable insights for policymakers".

In July 2022, Wang was conferred the Honorary Degree of Doctor of Letters by NUS. As an NUS alumnus, Wang was lauded for “his dedication to Sinology, his remarkable intellect, his trailblazing vision, and his public contributions”. The honorary doctorate celebrates the long-standing contributions and value that Wang’s scholarly insights bring to Singapore, Southeast Asia, and the world.

At age 91, Wang became one of the oldest people to win the Singapore Literature Prize, the other being literary pioneer Suratman Markasan. His memoir Home Is Where We Are,  topped the English creative non-fiction category in 2022.

Positions held  
Wang is a University Professor at the National University of Singapore and also Chairman of the Managing Board of the Lee Kuan Yew School of Public Policy. He was the Director (1997-2006) and Chairman (2006-19) of the East Asian Institute in Singapore. Wang was a Distinguished Professorial Fellow at the ISEAS - Yusof Ishak Institute where he was chairman of the board of Trustees from 1 November 2002 to 31 October 2019. He is also a Professor Emeritus of the Australian National University and a Fellow of the Australian Academy of the Humanities, elected in 1970 and serving as president from 1980 to 1983.

Wang was also Chairman of International Advisory Council in Universiti Tunku Abdul Rahman.

Selected publications

Books

 Wang, Gungwu (2019). China Reconnects: Joining a Deep-rooted Past to a New World Order. World Scientific Publishing
 Wang, Gungwu (2018). Home is Not Here. National University of Singapore Press

Book chapters, journal articles and papers

Additional media  

Wang discussed the demise of the Qing dynasty in China's Century of Humiliation.

References

Further reading 

1930 births
Living people
20th-century Australian writers
20th-century Singaporean writers
21st-century Australian writers
21st-century Singaporean writers
Alumni of SOAS University of London
Articles containing video clips
Australian people of Chinese descent
Australian sinologists
Commanders of the Order of the British Empire
Fellows of the Australian Academy of the Humanities
Historians of China
Indonesian emigrants to Singapore
Indonesian people of Chinese descent
Malaysian political party founders
Members of Academia Sinica
Members of the Executive Council of Hong Kong
Academic staff of the National University of Singapore
Officers of the Order of Australia
People from Surabaya
Singaporean emigrants to Australia
Singaporean people of Chinese descent
Singaporean sinologists
Vice-Chancellors of the University of Hong Kong
People with multiple nationality
Recipients of the Darjah Utama Bakti Cemerlang